Zada may refer to:
Zada (suffix)
An alternate spelling of Zadeh
Zada, West Virginia
Zada (footballer) (born 1980), Leonardo Martins Dinelli, Brazilian footballer

People with the surname Zada
Jason Zada
Norm Zada